Aleksey Feridovich Ismailov (born 1967) is a Russian mathematician who is a professor at the Faculty of Computer Science at the Moscow State University.

He defended the thesis Stable methods of finding special solutions of non-linear problems for the degree of Doctor of Physical and Mathematical Sciences in 1998.

He has authored 12 books and more than 150 scientific articles.

References

Bibliography

External links
 Annals of the Moscow University
 MSU CMC
 Scientific works of Aleksey Ismailov
 Scientific works of Aleksey Ismailov

Russian computer scientists
Russian mathematicians
Living people
Academic staff of Moscow State University
1967 births
Moscow State University alumni